David Geoffrey Chandler (15 January 1934 – 10 October 2004) was a British historian whose study focused on the Napoleonic era.

As a young man he served briefly in the army, reaching the rank of captain, and in later life he taught at the Royal Military Academy Sandhurst. Oxford University awarded him the D. Litt. in 1991. He held three visiting professorships: at Ohio State in 1970, at the Virginia Military Institute in 1988, and Marine Corps University in 1991.

According to his obituary in The Daily Telegraph, his "comprehensive account of Napoleon's battles" (The Campaigns of Napoleon) is "unlikely to be improved upon, despite a legion of rivals. 

General de Gaulle wrote to Chandler in French declaring that he had surpassed every other writer about the Emperor's military career."

He was also the author of a military biography of John Churchill, 1st Duke of Marlborough, and of The Art of Warfare in the Age of Marlborough.

Awards
1979 Gold Cross of Merit of Poland
1939–1960 British National Service

Works
 1966 – The Campaigns of Napoleon. New York: Macmillan. .
 1973 – Napoleon. London, Weidenfeld & Nicolson. . reprinted 2000, Barnsley, Pen & Sword .
 1979 – Dictionary of the Napoleonic Wars. New York: Macmillan. .
 1979 – Marlborough as Military Commander. London: Batsford. .
 1980 – Atlas of Military Strategy: The Art, Theory and Practice of War, 1618–1878. London: Arms & Armour. .
 1981 – Waterloo: The Hundred Days. Oxford: Osprey. .
 1987 – Napoleon's Marshals (ed.). New York: Macmillan. .
 1987 – The Military Maxims of Napoleon (ed.). London: Greenhill. .
 1987 – The Dictionary of Battles (ed.). London: Ebury Press. .
 1989 – Battles and Battlescenes of World War Two. New York: Macmillan. .
 1990 – The Illustrated Napoleon. London: Greenhill. .
 1990 – Austerlitz, 1805: Battle of the Three Emperors (Osprey Military Campaign). London: Osprey. .
 1990 – The Art of Warfare in the Age of Marlborough. Staplehurst, UK: Spellmount. .
 1993 – Jena 1806: Napoleon destroys Prussia Osprey Publishing. .
 1994 – On the Napoleonic Wars. London: Greenhill. .
 1994 – The Oxford Illustrated History of the British Army. (ed.). Oxford: University Press. .
 1994 – The D-Day Encyclopedia. (ed with James Lawton Collins Jr.). Upper Saddle River, NJ: Helicon .

See also
 Napoleon legacy and memory

References

Historians of Europe
Historians of the Napoleonic Wars
Historians of the French Revolution
1934 births
2004 deaths
Royal Army Educational Corps officers
20th-century British historians
Academics of the Royal Military Academy Sandhurst
20th-century British Army personnel